The Joint Bi-level Image Experts Group (JBIG) is a group of experts nominated by national standards bodies and major companies to work to produce standards for bi-level image coding. The "joint" refers to its status as a committee working on both ISO and ITU-T standards. It is one of two sub-groups of ISO/IEC Joint Technical Committee 1, Subcommittee 29, Working Group 1 (ISO/IEC JTC 1/SC 29/WG 1), whose official title is Coding of still pictures.

The Joint Bi-level Image Experts Group created the JBIG and JBIG2 standards. The group often meets jointly with the JPEG committee, which typically meets three times annually.

ISO/IEC JTC1 SC29 Working Group 1 (working together with ITU-T Study Group 16 – VCEG and previously also with Study Group 8 – SG8) is responsible for both JPEG and JBIG standards. It includes two sub-groups: the Joint Photographic Experts Group (JPEG SG) and the Joint Bi-level Image experts Group (JBIG SG).

In the mid-1980s, both CCITT (now ITU-T) and ISO had standardization groups for image coding: CCITT Study Group (SG) VIII (Telematic Services) and ISO TC97 SC2 WG8 (Coding of Audio and Picture Information). They were historically targeted on image communication. In 1986, it was decided to create the Joint (CCITT/ISO) Photographic Expert Group. In 1988, it was decided to create the Joint (CCITT/ISO) Bi-level Image Group – JBIG.

Published Standards 
JBIG have developed following standards, which were published by ISO/IEC and/or ITU-T:

Note: The published JBIG2 standard was revised by later amendments.

See also
 Joint Photographic Experts Group (JPEG)
 Moving Picture Experts Group (MPEG)

References

External links
 Official JBIG page

Graphics file formats
Working groups